The Journal of Elastomers and Plastics is a bimonthly peer-reviewed scientific journal that covers materials science of elastomers and plastics. The editor-in-chief is Heshmat A. Aglan (Tuskegee University). It was established in 1969 as the Journal of Elastoplastics, obtaining its current name in 1974. The journal is published by SAGE Publications.

Abstracting and indexing 
The journal is abstracted and indexed in Scopus and the Science Citation Index Expanded. According to the Journal Citation Reports, its 2020 impact factor is 1.833, ranking it 257th out of 334 journals in the category "Materials Science, Multidisciplinary" and 68th out of 91 journals in the category "Polymer Science".

References

External links 
 

SAGE Publishing academic journals
English-language journals
Materials science journals
Bimonthly journals
Publications established in 1969